The 1998 Bosch Spark Plug Grand Prix was the fourth round of the 1998 CART FedEx Champ Car World Series season, held on April 27, 1998, on the Nazareth Speedway in Nazareth, Pennsylvania. The race was won by Jimmy Vasser, his first win on an oval for nearly two years. Vasser won ahead of teammate and reigning champion Alex Zanardi, making it a 1-2 finish for Chip Ganassi Racing.

Classification

Race

Caution flags

Lap Leaders

Point standings after race

Bosch Spark Plug
Bosch Spark Plug
Bosch Spark Plug
Bosch Spark Plug